The 2006 NCAA Division I Men's Basketball Championship Game was the finals of the 2006 NCAA Division I men's basketball tournament and it determined the national champion for the 2005-06 NCAA Division I men's basketball season. The 2006 National Title Game was played at the RCA Dome in Indianapolis, Indiana. The 2006 National Title Game was played between the 2006 Oakland Regional Champions, No. 2-seeded UCLA and the 2006 Minneapolis Regional Champions, No. 3-seeded Florida.

Participants

Florida

Florida entered the 2006 NCAA tournament as the No. 3 seed in the Minneapolis Regional. In the 1st round, Lee Humphrey scored 20 points, Joakim Noah scored 16 points, and Al Horford scored 14 points to lead Florida past South Alabama with a 76–50 victory. In the 2nd round, Corey Brewer scored 23 points and Joakim Noah scored 17 points to rout Milwaukee with an 82–60 victory. In the Sweet 16, Corey Brewer made a  twisting falling down shot which became a three-point play with 27.5 seconds remaining to defeat Georgetown 57-53 and advance to the Elite Eight. In the Elite Eight, Joakim Noah had a monster night by scoring 21 points which led to Florida beating Villanova 75-62 and advancing to the Final Four. In their semifinal matchup against Cinderella team George Mason, Florida had a successful night from outside the arc and won 73-58 for a trip to the title game.

UCLA

UCLA entered the 2006 NCAA tournament as the No. 2 seed in the Oakland Regional. In the 1st round, UCLA routed Belmont with a 78–44 victory in the battle of the Bruins. In the 2nd round, Jordan Farmar scored 18 points making five three-pointers which was supported by Arron Afflalo's 13 points and Ryan Hollins's 12 points to beat Alabama 62-59 for a trip to Oakland for the Sweet 16. In the Sweet 16, UCLA finished the game with an 11–0 run to complete a 17-point comeback for a 73–71 win over Gonzaga. In the Elite Eight, Arron Afflalo scored 15 points to beat Memphis 50–45 in the lowest scoring Regional Finals during the shot-clock era to send UCLA to the 2006 Final Four. In the national semifinal, UCLA shut down LSU 59–45 to advance to the title game.

Starting lineups

Game summary

References

NCAA Division I Men's Basketball Championship Game
NCAA Division I Men's Basketball Championship Games
Florida Gators men's basketball
UCLA Bruins men's basketball
Basketball competitions in Indianapolis
College basketball tournaments in Indiana
NCAA Division I men's basketball championship game
NCAA Division I Men's Basketball Championship Game
2000s in Indianapolis